Potassium perrhenate is an inorganic compound with the chemical formula KReO4.

Preparation 
Potassium perrhenate can be produced by the neutralization of potassium hydroxide and perrhenic acid.

Properties
Potassium perrhenate is a white solid that is sparingly soluble in water and ethanol. It have a tetragonal crystal system with the space group I41/a (No. 88), and lattice constants a = 567.4 pm and c = 1266.8 pm. It is a strong oxidizer.

References

Potassium compounds
Perrhenates